Semiotics of culture is a research field within semiotics that attempts to define culture from semiotic perspective and as a type of human symbolic activity, creation of signs and a way of giving meaning to everything around. Therefore, here culture is understood as a system of symbols or meaningful signs. Because the main sign system is the linguistic system, the field is usually referred to as semiotics of culture and language. Under this field of study symbols are analyzed and categorized in certain class within the hierarchal system. With postmodernity, metanarratives are no longer as pervasive and thus categorizing these symbols in this postmodern age is more difficult and rather critical.

The research field was of particular interest for the Tartu–Moscow Semiotic School (USSR). Linguists and semioticians by the Tartu School viewed culture as a hierarchical semiotic system consisting of a set of functions correlated to it, and linguistic codes that are used by social groups to maintain coherence. These codes are viewed as superstructures based on natural language, and here the ability of humans to symbolize is central.

The study received a research ground also in Japan where the idea that culture and nature should not be contrasted and contradicted but rather harmonized was developed.

See also
 Culture
 Cultural bias
 Culture theory
 Culture war
 Cultural dissonance
 Cultural imperialism

References 
 Lotman, Jurij M., and Boris A. Uspenskij. "Eterogeneità e omogeneità delle culture. Postscriptum alle tesi collettive'." Tesi per una semiotica della cultura (2006): 149–153.
 Lotman, Jurij M. La cultura come mente collettiva e i problemi della intelligenza artificiale. Guaraldi, 2014.
 Kull, Kalevi. "Juri Lotman in English." Sign Systems Studies 39.2/4 (2011): 343–356.
 Sonesson, Göran. "Between homeworld and alienworld: A primer of cultural semiotics." Sign Culture= Zeichen Kultur (2012): 315–328.
 Schleiner, Louise. Cultural Semiotics, Spenser, and the Captive Woman. Lehigh University Press, 1995.
 Torop, Peeter. "Cultural semiotics and culture." (1999).
 Torop, Peeter. "Semiotics in Tartu." (1998).
 10.1.2 Semiotics of culture in Dmitriĭ Olegovich Dobrovolʹskiĭ, Dmitrij Dobrovol'skij, Elisabeth Piirainen, Figurative language: cross-cultural and cross-linguistic perspectives, Emerald Group Publishing, 2005
 Salupere, Silvi; Torop, Peeter; Kull, Kalevi (ed.) 2013. Beginnings of the Semiotics of Culture. (Tartu Semiotics Library 13.) Tartu: University of Tartu Press.
 Baldini, Massimo. Semiotica della moda. Armando, 2005.
 Лотман, Ю. М. "Семиотика культуры и понятие текста." Лотман ЮМ Избранные статьи 1 (1997): 129–132.
 Успенский, Борис Андреевич. "Семиотика истории. Семиотика культуры." Избранные труды в (1994).
 Кнабе, Г. Семиотика культуры. DirectMEDIA, 2005.
 Золотых, Л. Г. "Семиотика культуры и формирование фразеологической семантики." Известия Волгоградского государственного педагогического университета 3 (2006).

Culture
Semiotics